Jose Midas Pascual Marquez (born February 16, 1966) is an associate justice of the Supreme Court of the Philippines since 2021, and was previously the ex-member of the Office of the Court Administrator and the Supreme Court spokesperson of the Philippines. Marquez holds the record of being the longest-serving SC Court Administrator. Marquez was included in the final shortlist of official nominees as Associate Justice of the Supreme Court by Judicial and Bar Council, with the recommendation of Chief Justice Gesmundo, before being passed to the President for the appointment.

Early life and career 
Marquez was born on February 16, 1966. He obtained his Bachelor of Arts in Economics in 1987 and Juris Doctor in 1993, both from the Ateneo de Manila University. Marquez graduated with a degree in law from the Ateneo de Manila University and became a member of the Philippine Bar in 1994.   He was working with a position of Executive Assistant I at the age of 25, in his second year in law school.

Supreme Court of the Philippines 
President Rodrigo Duterte appointed Marquez as the 192nd associate justice of the Supreme Court of the Philippines on September 27, 2021.

Controversy 
Presidential daughter and Davao City mayor Sara Duterte-Carpio opposed his bid for a Supreme Court post back in 2018. She issued a statement saying the Supreme Court aspirant is trying to gain her favor through asking complainants and witnesses to withdraw the disbarment case filed against her for punching a sheriff during a demolition in 2011. 

Marquez has also been cited as chiefly responsible for the filed quo warranto against Chief Justice Maria Lourdes Sereno.

References

External links 
 Central Books Jose Midas Marquez
The Manila Times   Midas Marquez is new high court spokesman
Philippine News Agency   Marquez shrugs off opposition to SC justice bid
Office of the Court Administrator        COURT ADMINISTRATOR Jose Midas P.Marquez

1966 births
Living people
20th-century Filipino lawyers
Associate Justices of the Supreme Court of the Philippines
Ateneo de Manila University alumni